Adam Hope (1834 – 9 October 1916) was an Australian cricketer. He played two first-class cricket matches for Victoria in 1863.

See also
 List of Victoria first-class cricketers

References

1834 births
1916 deaths
Australian cricketers
Victoria cricketers
Place of birth missing